Stathis Mantalozis (1 January 1929 – 2 November 1993) was a Greek footballer. He played in ten matches for the Greece national football team from 1953 to 1957. He was also part of Greece's team for their qualification matches for the 1954 FIFA World Cup.

References

External links
 

1929 births
1993 deaths
Greek footballers
Greece international footballers
Place of birth missing
Association footballers not categorized by position